Xi'an Middle School of Shaanxi Province is a senior high school in Xi'an, Shaanxi, China.

It was established in 1905.

The school is located in Fengcheng 5th Road of Xi’an Economic and Technological Development Zone.

The school begins to teach aircraft students this year.

In 2015, its branch school Xi'an Jingkai Middle school was established.

The school have made great relationships with many international friend schools.

There are great sources of teaching.

References

External links
 Xi'an Middle School of Shaanxi Province 

High schools in Shaanxi
Schools in Xi'an
Junior secondary schools in China
Educational institutions established in 1905
1905 establishments in China